Communist Party of Iceland (Marxist–Leninist) (in Icelandic: Kommúnistaflokkur Íslands (m-l)), was a political party in Iceland. It was established in April 1976 by 30 delegates. Initially known as Communist Movement M-L (Kommúnistahreyfingin M-L; KHML), from  1972 until 1976 Kommúnistasamtökin marxistarnir-lenínistarnir (KSML).  Published Stéttabaráttan (Class Struggle). Publication was initiated in 1972 and ceased in 1980. Chairman was Gunnar Andrésson and General Secretary Kristján Guðlaugsson.

The party was linked to the Swedish KPML(r).

It recognized the Albanian Party of Labor as the leader of the world communist movement.

Publications 
 Rauði fáninn 1972 (KSML) - 7.1979
 Stéttabaráttan 1972 (KHML/KSML) - 9.1980
 Programme of the Communist Party of Iceland Marxist-Leninist, Reykjavík: Central Committee of CPI M-L, July 1976

References

Further reading 
 Robert J. Alexander: Maoism in the developed world, Westport, Conn: Praeger 2001, pp. 144–45 (Maoism in Iceland)

Communist parties in Iceland
Defunct political parties in Iceland
Maoist organizations in Europe
1976 establishments in Iceland
Political parties established in 1976
Political parties with year of disestablishment missing